The Club Sportif Sfaxien Women's Basketball Club or in ( Arabic language : النادي الرياضي الصفاقسي لكرة السلة للسيدات ) is a Tunisian women's professional basketball club from Sfax and one of CS Sfaxien Women's main Section, The club currently plays in the Tunisian Women's Division I Basketball League Top division. The Salle Raed Bejaoui is their home.

Honours

CS Sfaxien won a total of 26 local titles :
 Tunisian League 19 times: 
 Years : 1992, 1997, 1998, 1999, 2001, 2002, 2003, 2004, 2005, 2006, 2007, 2010, 2011, 2012, 2013, 2014, 2015, 2016, 2019
 Tunisian Basketball Cup 7 times: 
 Years : 1998, 2002, 2005, 2006, 2007, 2009, 2013

CS Sfaxien won a total of 2 Arabs titles :
 Arab Clubs Championship 2 times : 
  Years : 1999, 2000
  Finalist : 1998, 2007, 2017

Current squad

Coaches

Notable players

See also
CS Sfaxien
CS Sfaxien (volleyball)
CS Sfaxien Women's Volleyball

References

External links
Official Website 
CSS Basketball Page

Basketball teams in Tunisia
Basketball teams established in 1928
1928 establishments in Tunisia
Sfax